Max Purcell was the defending champion but lost to Bradley Mousley in the second qualifying round.

Thomas Fabbiano won the title after defeating Teymuraz Gabashvili 7–5, 6–1 in the final.

Seeds

Draw

Finals

Top half

Bottom half

References
Main Draw
Qualifying Draw

Gimcheon Open ATP Challenger - Singles
2017 Singles